Albay local elections were  held on May 13, 2019 as part of the 2019 Philippine general election. Voters  selected their candidates of choice for all local positions: municipal or city mayor, vice mayor and councilors, as well as members of the Sangguniang Panlalawigan, the vice-governor, governor and representatives for the three districts of Albay in the House of Representatives. 
These elections were held following the first-past-the-post voting system, in which the candidate with the highest number (but not necessarily a majority) of votes is elected.

Gubernatorial and Vice Gubernatorial election
As with other provinces in the Philippines, the governor, and vice governor of Albay are elected separately. Therefore, they may be of different parties when elected.

Governor
One-term consecutive, four-term non-consecutive incumbent Governor Al Francis Bichara ran for reelection. Bichara's opponents included broadcast journalist Hermogenes Alegre Jr., self-claimed general Galma Arcilla, Vice Governor Harold Imperial, and retired COMELEC Bicol Regional Director Zacarias Zaragoza. The three perennial candidates who faced Bichara in 2016, Paul Aguilar, Mario Baquil, and Jaime Hernandez, Jr., also ran again. 
Bichara won reelection to a second consecutive, fifth non-consecutive term.

Vice Governor
Incumbent Vice-Governor Harold Imperial is term-limited. He ran for governor instead. Running to replace him are former Quezon City Councilor and Albay First District Representative Edcel Greco Lagman, and Legazpi City Councilor and Albay Councilors League President and ex-officio Board Member Alan Rañola. Bonifacio Regidor withdrew his candidacy for this position. 
Lagman won the election for this office.

Congressional elections

1st District
One-term consecutive, seven-term non-consecutive Representative Edcel Lagman is running for reelection. Facing him is Santo Domingo Mayor Herbie Aguas. 
Lagman won reelection to a second consecutive, eighth non-consecutive term.

2nd District
One-term consecutive, four-term non-consecutive Representative Jose Maria Clemente Salceda sought reelection.  He was reelected to this position.

3rd District
Incumbent Fernando Gonzalez is term-limited. His party nominated his chief of staff, Fernando Cabredo. Former Representative Reno Lim is trying to reclaim this seat. Other candidates are Mario Marcos and Elmer Felix Pornel. 
Cabredo was elected to represent this district.

Sangguniang Panlalawigan Elections
All three legislative districts of Albay will members of the Albay Provincial Board. The first and second districts send three board members each, while the third district sends four board members. The election is via plurality-at-large voting; a voter can vote up to the maximum number of board members his district is sending as apportioned.

1st District
Freshmen incumbent Board Members Reynaldo Bragais and Victor Ziga, Jr. ran for reelection. Board Member Job Belen is term-limited and ran for Malilipot Vice Mayor. Also vying for this position are multi-level marketing company head Jose Betito, former Board Member Baby Glenda Bongao, and Tabaco City Councilor Sheina Onrubia.

|-bgcolor=black
|colspan=5|

2nd District
One-term incumbent Board Member Raul Rosal ran for reelection. Board Member Ralph Andes is term-limited while two-term Senior Board Member Richard Benjamin Imperial retired. Also vying for this position are Legazpi City Councilors Melissa Abadeza and Jesus Chito Baldo, Political dynasty candidates Ivan Andes and Maria Paz Salud Imperial, and Daraga Councilor and former board member Neil Montallana.

|-bgcolor=black
|colspan=5|

3rd District
Neophyte incumbent Board Members Dante Arandia, Howard Sim Imperial, Eva Josephine Ribaya, and Jesus Salceda, Jr. ran for reelection. Libon Councilor Mark Ian Cortes also ran for this position.

|-bgcolor=black
|colspan=5|

City and municipal elections
All cities and municipalities of Albay will elect its mayor and vice-mayor this election. The candidates for mayor and vice mayor with the plurality of votes wins the seat. The mayor and vice mayor are elected separately; therefore, they may be of different parties when they are elected. However, these candidates may form a  de facto coalition wherein a mayoral and vice mayoral candidate of different party affiliation will campaign together with a slate of candidates for councilors.

1st District
City:Tabaco
Municipalities: Bacacay, Malilipot, Malinao, Santo Domingo, Tiwi

Tabaco City
One-term consecutive, three-term nonconsecutive incumbent Mayor Cielo Krisel Lagman-Luistro is running for reelection.

One-term incumbent Vice Mayor Nestor San Pablo is unopposed for reelection.

Bacacay
One-term Incumbent Armando Romano is running for reelection. Running against him are Gil Bea, and topnotcher Councilor Edsel Belleza.

One-term incumbent Vice Mayor Divina Gracia Bonavente is challenged for reelection by former Mayor Tobias Betito.

Malilipot
One-term Incumbent Cenon Volante is running for reelection. Former Mayor Roli Volante, whom Cenon unseated in the 2016 election, sought a rematch.

One-term incumbent Vice Mayor Johanes Ampig is challenged for reelection by Board Member Job Belen and dynastic candidate Rolando Volante.

Malinao
One-term consecutive, three-term nonconsecutive incumbent Mayor Avelino Ceriola had been dismissed from his position by the Office of the Ombudsman. This is in connection with the graft and administrative cases filed against him for the alleged illegal construction and operation of a cockpit arena that he owned; but he refused to step down. He was later unseated and his 2016 opponent, former Mayor Alicia Morales took over this office. Mayor Morales will face former Mayor Emiliana Kare and Councilor Lenybelle Santos.

|-
|
|colspan="6"| Kusog Bikolandia gain from PDP–Laban 
|-

Two-term incumbent Vice Mayor Sheryl Bilo is running for reelection.

Santo Domingo
Incumbent Herbie Aguas is term-limited and is running for representative. Former Councilor Joseling Aguas, Jr. is his party's nominee. Vice Mayor Nomar Banda and resort owner Noel Estillomo are also seeking the mayoralty position.

One-term incumbent Vice Mayor Nomar Banda is running for mayor. Councilor Marvin Oringo is running for this position.

Tiwi
One-term consecutive, four term nonconsecutive incumbent Mayor Jaime Villanueva is facing a rematch with former Mayor Leo Templado.

Two-term incumbent Vice Mayor David Beato is being challenged for this office by topnotcher Councilor Rebecca Lizardo.

2nd District
City: Legazpi
Municipalities: Camalig, Daraga, Manito, Rapu-rapu

Legazpi City
Two-term consecutive, five-term nonconsecutive incumbent Mayor Noel Rosal is running for reelection.

One-term incumbent Vice Mayor Oscar Robert Cristobal is unopposed for reelection.

Camalig
One-term incumbent Mayor Maria Ahrdail Baldo is swapping posts with one-term incumbent Vice Mayor Carlos Irwin Baldo, Jr. Both of them are running unopposed.

Daraga
Three-term consecutive, five-term nonconsecutive Mayor Gerry Jaucian died on May 4, 2018. Then Vice Mayor Carlwyn Baldo ascended to this office. Baldo is seeking a full term in this position. He sought this office in 2010 and 2013, losing both times to Jaucian. He won as Vice Mayor in a fractured field in 2016, defeating the then, two-term consecutive, five-term nonconsecutive incumbent vice mayor. He is facing off with three-term Ako Bicol Representative Rodel Batocabe and elevated Vice Mayor Victor Perete.

On December 22, 2018, Batocabe was attending a gift-giving event for senior citizens and persons with disabilities in the rural barangay of Burgos of the municipality when two men approached and shot him. His police escort, Senior Police Officer 2 Orlando Diaz, was also killed, while seven elderly attendees were also wounded in the attack. Batocabe and Diaz were taken to a hospital in Legazpi City, where both were pronounced dead.

On January 3, 2019, Philippine National Police Director General Oscar Albayalde announced in a press conference that Mayor Carlwyn Baldo is the suspected mastermind for the murder of Representative Batocabe. According to the police, Baldo hired six men to kill Batocabe and set up $95,000 in funds to pay for the murder. The plot had allegedly been in the works since August 2018, when Baldo supplied $4,600 to one of the hitmen to purchase guns and motorcycles. Mayor Carlwyn Baldo denied the allegations in a statement read over the phone to local radio stations, calling himself " a convenient scapegoat."

On January 6, 2019, Lakas–CMD said that it has revoked its Certificate of Nomination and Acceptance (CONA) for Baldo. Batocabe's party, the National Unity Party named his widow, Gertrudes, as his substitute. However, Representative Batocabe's name is going to remain on the ballot.

On May 6, 2019, the Legazpi City Regional Trial Court ordered the arrest of Baldo for the murder of Batocabe and his police escort. While the police said that Baldo has sent word that he would immediately surrender when he is served arrest warrants, he was declared by the police as a "wanted person" after failure to serve his warrant of arrest two days after its issuance. Baldo surrendered on May 10, 2019, four days after the court issued the warrant for his arrest.

One-term incumbent Vice Mayor Carlwyn Baldo assumed the Office of the Mayor after the death of Mayor Gerry Jaucian. Topnotcher Councilor Victor Perete was then elevated into the position of Vice Mayor. Vice Mayor Perete forwent election for a full term and is running for Mayor instead. Former Councilor Joseph Espinas and incumbent Councilors Gerry Raphael Jaucian, Jr. and Joey Marcellana are facing off for this post.

Manito
One-term incumbent  Joshua Mari Daep is running for reelection. Challenging him is 2016 mayoral candidate Rebecca Chen. 

One-term incumbent Vice Mayor Carlito Belludo is running for reelection. His challengers include former Councilor Marjun Dagsil, Councilor Arly Guiriba and Diego Lopez.

Rapu-rapu
Two-term incumbent Mayor Ronald Galicia is running for reelection. He is being challenged by Fiel Vizcaya.

Two-term incumbent Vice Mayor Nora Oñate is vying for a final consecutive term in office. Her challenger is Amando de la Cruz, Jr.

3rd District
City: Ligao
Municipalities: Guinobatan, Jovellar, Libon, Oas, Pio Duran, Polangui

Ligao City
Incumbent Mayor Patricia Alsua is running for a third term in office.

One-term incumbent Vice Mayor Sherwin Quising is running for city councilor. Running to replace him are City Councilors Manuel Garcia, and Teodorico Residilla, Jr.

Guinobatan
Incumbent Mayor Ann Ongjoco is unopposed for a final, consecutive term in office.

Two-term incumbent Vice Mayor Julio Tingzon, IV is challenged for reelection by topnotcher Councilor Rolando Palabrica.

Jovellar

Incumbent Mayor Jorem Arcangel is term-limited and is running for Vice Mayor. His party nominated topnotcher Councilor Joseph Arcangel, who will run unopposed for this position. 

Incumbent Vice Mayor Jose Nobleza, Jr. is term-limited and is running for municipal councilor. Mayor Jorem Arcangel will run unopposed for this position.

Libon
One-term incumbent Mayor Wilfredo Maronilla is unopposed for reelection. 

One-term incumbent Vice Mayor Markgregor Edward Sayson is unopposed for reelection.

Oas
One-term incumbent Mayor Domingo Escoto, Jr. is running for reelection. His opponents are former Mayor Gregorio Ricarte and Vice Mayor Antonio Yuchongco II.

One-term incumbent Vice Mayor Antonio Yuchongco, II is running for mayor. His party nominated municipal Councilor Reene Raro. He will be facing Barangay Chairman of San Isidro, and concurrent Oas ABC President, ex-officio municipal Councilor Joseph Rentosa.

Pio Duran
Incumbent Mayor Alan Arandia is unopposed for a second term in office.

One-term incumbent Vice Mayor Marvin Quiroz is challenged for reelection by former Mayor Henry Callope.

Polangui
Incumbent Mayor Cherilie Sampal is term-limited. Her party nominated political dynasty candidate Norman Sampal. Vice Mayor Herbert Borja, and Councilor Andy Mariscotes are also running for this open seat.

One-term incumbent Vice Mayor Herbert Borja is running for mayor. Running for this position are former Vice Mayor Renato Borja, municipal Councilor Restituto Fernandez, and Dexter Salinel.

Maps

References

External links
Commission on Elections

2019 Philippine local elections
Elections in Albay
May 2019 events in the Philippines